Per Hegna (born 22 July 1945) is a Norwegian former professional tennis player.

A native of Oslo, Hegna played out of the Berg Tennisklubb and won 26 national championships, including eight outdoor and six indoor singles titles. His Davis Cup career for Norway started in 1962 but most of his appearances came in the period of 1973 to 1983. He featured in 17 ties, for 15 wins across singles and doubles.

Hegna played collegiate tennis in the United States for the University of Wyoming. He featured in several Grand Prix tournaments during the 1970s, reaching a best singles world ranking of 180. As a main draw qualifier at the 1976 Swedish Open he upset seeded players Juan Gisbert and Julián Ganzábal en route to the quarter-finals.

References

External links
 
 
 

1945 births
Living people
Norwegian male tennis players
Wyoming Cowboys and Cowgirls athletes
College men's tennis players in the United States
Sportspeople from Oslo